Dana Graziano (former Graziano Trasmissioni) is an Italian company based in Turin manufacturing gearboxes, drivelines and their mechatronics components.
It makes the "Pre-Cog" seven-speed Seamless-Shift gearbox (SSG) dual-clutch transmission used in the McLaren 12C.

Dana Graziano is the world's largest supplier of precision gears and shafts for final reduction components within the agricultural and off-highway vehicle.

The company is also known for supplying transmission and mechatronics for premium performance cars. Customers include McLaren, Ferrari, Lamborghini, Audi, Maserati, Alfa Romeo and Aston Martin, while some Mercedes-AMG models use the Graziano Power Transfer Unit.
Competitors are Germans ZF Friedrichshafen, Getrag and BorgWarner which produce modules for the Volkswagen DSG gearbox.

History
Graziano Trasmissioni was started in 1951 as a small family company with 15 employees by Carlo Graziano. In 1963, the company moved to its present headquarters in Cascine Vica. After 1981, the company's export activity increased progressively. The company then expanded, opening a factory in India in 1999, another in Suzhou (China) in 2006 and a third in Červený Kostelec (Czech Republic), in 2006.

In 2007 it merged with North American Fairfield, becoming Oerlikon Drive Systems, part of the Oerlikon Group.

In March 2019, the Drive Systems segment of the Oerlikon Group, including the Graziano and Fairfield brands, was purchased by Dana Incorporated and have become product brands of the company.

Applications
From 1996-1997, starts the cooperation with Ferrari, it developed and supplied the complete gearboxes for the Ferrari 360, 612 Scaglietti, Enzo, F430, 575M Maranello.

The Lamborghini Aventador uses a single-clutch lightweight 7-speed automated manual gearbox built by Graziano. Despite being single-clutch, gear-shifts are accomplished in 50ms.
The Gallardo and the first-generation Audi R8 used a mid-engine Graziano gearbox (manual or automated manual versions).
 
The DCT gearbox used in the Audi R8 was developed in partnership with Graziano. It is built and pretested at Graziano's Luserna plant in Italy before shipment to Volkswagen's Kassel plant in Germany, where the clutch and mechatronics modules are added. The finished transmission is then sent to Audi.

The Aston Martin One-77, Vantage S, V8 Vantage, Aston Martin DB9  and Maserati GranTurismo S use rear-transaxle gearboxes, while the Maserati Quattroporte and Coupé & Spyder Trofeo- GranSport had an MT-AMT automated manual gearboxes.

The 2014 McLaren 650S uses the second generation of the SSG, with revised software which improves shifting times by further 0.3s.

Graziano supplies the 2020 Aston Martin Victor with its manual gearbox to handle its  of torque.

See also 

List of Italian companies

References

External links
 Dana Incorporated official site
 Graziano and Fairfield official site
 UK subsidiary
 Graziano brochure. Lists the cars equipped with Graziano gearboxes. This list includes various Ferraris (360, 430, 575M, 612, Enzo), the Lamborghini Gallardo/Audi R8, Alfa Romeo 8C Competizione, Aston Martin V8 Vantage and DB9 and Maserati Quattroporte and Coupé/Spyder.

Manufacturing companies established in 1951
Auto parts suppliers of Italy
Automotive transmission makers
Italian companies established in 1951
Italian brands
OC Oerlikon